Biala is a locality in the Upper Lachlan Shire, New South Wales, Australia. It lies about 27 km northwest of Gunning and 95 km north of Canberra.

References

Upper Lachlan Shire
Localities in New South Wales
Southern Tablelands